Ridge is an unincorporated community in Carter County, Montana, United States. Its elevation is 3,970 feet.

Geography
Ridge appears on the Belle Creek South U.S. Geological Survey Map. Carter County is in the Mountain Time Zone (UTC -7 hours).

Climate
According to the Köppen Climate Classification system, Ridge has a semi-arid climate, abbreviated "BSk" on climate maps.

References

Unincorporated communities in Carter County, Montana
Unincorporated communities in Montana